Gremuchy Klyuch is a rural locality (a village) in Kuzhbakhtinsky Selsoviet, Ilishevsky District, Bashkortostan, Russia. The population was 101 as of 2010.

Geography 
It is located 28 km from Verkhneyarkeyevo and 5 km from Tazeyevo.

References 

Rural localities in Ilishevsky District